The Stockenström Baronetcy, of Maas Ström in the Cape of Good Hope, was a title in the Baronetage of the United Kingdom. It was created on 29 April 1840 for Andries Stockenström, Lieutenant-Governor of British Kaffraria between 1836 and 1838. The title became extinct on the death of the fourth Baronet in 1957.

Stockenström baronets, of Maas Ström (1840)

Sir Andries Stockenstrom, 1st Baronet (1792–1864)
Sir Gysbert Henry Stockenstrom, 2nd Baronet (1841–1912)
Sir Andries Stockenstrom, 3rd Baronet (1868–1922)
Sir Anders Johan Booysen Stockenstrom, 4th Baronet (1908–1957)

References

Extinct baronetcies in the Baronetage of the United Kingdom